Fighting Stock is a 1935 British comedy film directed by and starring Tom Walls. It also features Robertson Hare, Lesley Wareing and Herbert Lomas. its plot involves a Brigadier who retires to a country cottage for some quiet fishing, but it soon overtaken by madcap events. The screenplay is by Ben Travers based on his earlier stage play of the same name, and the cast included cast members from Travers's Aldwych Farces.

It was filmed at Islington Studios with sets by Oscar Friedrich Werndorff.

Cast
 Tom Walls as Brig. Gen. Sir Donald Rowley  
 Ralph Lynn as Sydney Rowley  
 Robertson Hare as Duck  
 Marie Lohr as Mrs. Barbara Rivers  
 Herbert Lomas as Murlow  
 Lesley Wareing as Eileen Rivers  
 Veronica Rose as Diana Rivers  
 Hubert Harben as Mr. Rivers  
 Margaret Davidge as Mrs. Fenton  
 Peggy Simpson as Maid  
 Mary Jerrold as Emmie  
 Sybil Grove as Mrs. Peacock  
 Norah Howard as Ada

Critical reception
Sky Movies gave the film three out of five stars, and wrote, "The `Aldwych' comedy trio of Tom Walls, Ralph Lynn and J Robertson Hare in another of their great laughter hits from the Thirties, this one taking the mickey out of the huntin', shootin' and fishin' brigade. Tom Walls also directs, and keeps the fun fast and frantic. Amusing Tom and Jerry-style stuff from some highly polished farceurs."

References

Bibliography
 Low, Rachael. Filmmaking in 1930s Britain. George Allen & Unwin, 1985.
 Wood, Linda. British Films, 1927-1939. British Film Institute, 1986.

External links

1935 films
1935 comedy films
British comedy films
Gainsborough Pictures films
Islington Studios films
Films set in England
Films directed by Tom Walls
British black-and-white films
1930s English-language films
1930s British films